Almereyda is a surname. Notable people with the surname include:

Michael Almereyda (born 1960), American film director, screenwriter, and film producer
Miguel Almereyda (1883–1917), French journalist and activist against militarism